Xestipyge conjunctum is a species of clown beetle in the family Histeridae. It is found in North America, ranging from Ontario to Florida and Texas.  It is between 2.2 and 2.5 mm in length, and belongs to the tribe Paromalini.

References

Further reading

 

Histeridae
Articles created by Qbugbot
Beetles described in 1825